Marmaduke Stalkartt (1750 – 24 September 1805) was an English naval architect.

Life
Marmaduke Stalkartt was the fourth child of Hugh Stalkartt. After presumably serving an apprenticeship at Deptford Dockyard, he was sent to India in 1796 to establish shipyards to build men-of-war in teak.

Stalkartt's Naval architecture (1781) was divided into seven books: 'Of Whole-Moulding'; 'Of the Yacht'; 'Of the Sloop'; 'Of the Forty-Four-Gun-Ship'; 'Of the Seventy-Four-Gun-Ship'; 'Of the Cutter, and Ending of the Lines'; and 'Of the Frigate'. It was reviewed appreciatively in The Critical Review and The Monthly Review.

Works
 Naval architecture, or, The rudiments and rules of ship building: exemplified in a series of draughts and plans: with observations sending to the further improvement of that important art, 1781. Google Books

References

External links
 Lars Bruzelius, Marmaduke Stalkartt

1750 births
1805 deaths
British naval architects